The Rhode Island State House, the capitol of the state of Rhode Island, is located at 900 Smith Street just below the crest of Smith Hill, on the border of downtown in Providence. It is a neoclassical building designed by McKim, Mead & White which features the fourth largest structural-stone dome in the world,  topped by a gilded statue of "The Independent Man", representing freedom and independence. The building houses the Rhode Island General Assembly – the state House of Representatives is located in the west wing, and the Senate in the east – and the offices of the governor, lieutenant governor, secretary of state, and general treasurer of Rhode Island. Other state offices are located in separate buildings on a campus just north of the State House. 

The structure was added to the National Register of Historic Places in 1970.



History

The current Rhode Island State House is Rhode Island's seventh state house and the second in Providence after the Old State House. The structure was designed by McKim, Mead & White, a prominent firm from New York. The building was constructed from 1891 to 1901. The structure underwent a major renovation in the late 1990s.

A private organization, the State House Restoration Society, raises funds and advocates for the landmark building.

Architecture

The dome is "the fourth largest self-supported marble dome in the world".

Independent Man (1899) 

On top of the dome stands a gold-covered bronze statue of a male figure known as The Independent Man. The statue, originally named "Hope," was designed by George Brewster and installed in 1899. The Independent Man represents freedom and independence and alludes to the independent spirit which led Roger Williams to settle and establish Providence Plantations and later the Colony of Rhode Island and Providence Plantations.

The chamber of the Rhode Island Senate is located in the east wing of the building, and the chamber of the Rhode Island House of Representatives is located in the west wing. Other notable rooms include the rotunda (beneath the dome), the State Library (north end), and the State Room (south end). The State Room is an entrance area for the office of the governor and contains a full-scale portrait of George Washington by Rhode Island native Gilbert Stuart. This room is also where the governor has press conferences and bill signings at the State House.

The State House was one of the first public buildings to use electricity. It is currently lit by 109 floodlights and two searchlights at night.

Controversy
In 2013, Governor Lincoln Chafee's administration started to remove grass from the eastern side of the State House lawn in order to provide extra parking for employees. The move was opposed by the Capital Center Commission, the public board designated to oversee zoning requirements within the district. Supporters of the proposed parking say that there is demand from employees and visitors to the building. Opponents point to existing zoning requirements that make the surface lot illegal, point to the expense of providing parking, and advocate an increased presence for transit, biking, walking, and carpooling instead. The state spent $3.1 million on an adjoining piece of land on Francis Street next to I-95 for parking, which provides 100 parking spots at around $30,000 a space.

Christmas at the State House

It is an annual State House tradition to feature a Christmas tree and community and cultural holiday displays each December. A Fraser fir or Balsam fir is erected in the rotunda and decorated. The tree, donated by a local family or tree farm, is typically between 17 and 25 feet tall.

It has become a holiday tradition in local media to feature stories about problems with Rhode Island's state tree, often meriting front page treatment:

 In 2005, the tree was removed from the rotunda after a treatment with flame retardant caused the needles to fall out. 
 In 2007, a "sickly-looking" tree was replaced a few weeks before Christmas.
 In 2011  Bishop Thomas J. Tobin and others objected to the wording on tree-lighting ceremony invitations, which referred to the tree as a "holiday" tree. Protestors at the tree-lighting ceremony lit a protest tree of their own and sang “O, Christmas Tree,” drowning out the official music provided by a local children's chorus.
 In 2012, the official tree lighting ceremony was canceled.
 In 2013, Governor Chafee changed the wording to "Christmas" tree.
 In 2016, a 14-foot Fraser fir was deemed too small for the rotunda. A replacement 20-foot tree was placed in the rotunda, and the smaller tree moved to the south steps.
 In 2017, the rotunda's 25-foot Fraser fir made national headlines when it began dropping needles "at an alarming rate," after being on display for three weeks. The New York Post called it "the saddest state capital Christmas tree." The sickly tree was replaced with a smaller (12-foot) tree.
 The 2018 tree was an 18-foot tall Douglas fir donated by a South Kingstown tree farm.
 For 2019, state staff assembled and decorated 18-foot artificial tree, described as a "replica of a California Baby Redwood."

Since 2014, holiday displays from "any Rhode Island area-based religious or secular group" have been featured on the first and second floors. Participating groups have included local religious, ethnic, and secular organizations.

In popular culture
The building served as the United States Capitol exterior in the 1997 film Amistad and the City Hall of Capital City in Disney's Underdog.

Gallery

See also
National Register of Historic Places listings in Providence, Rhode Island
List of state and territorial capitols in the United States
List of tallest buildings in Providence, Rhode Island

References

External links

 Rhode Island State House Visitor Center
 Rhode Island Historical Society (RIHS)
 

Buildings and structures in Providence, Rhode Island
Government buildings on the National Register of Historic Places in Rhode Island
Government of Rhode Island
McKim, Mead & White buildings
Neoclassical architecture in Rhode Island
Government buildings with domes
State capitols in the United States
Tourist attractions in Providence, Rhode Island
National Register of Historic Places in Providence, Rhode Island